Vinay Rohrra  (born 15 March 1986) is an Indian television actor. He is well-known for playing the lead role of Ranbir in TV show Ranbir Rano on Zee TV and male lead role of Sharad on Badi Door Se Aaye Hai. Most recently he has played Madhav Solanki in Kaatelal & Sons.

Career
Rohrra made his television debut with Ranbir Rano as Ranbir. After that he played the role of Bajirao in Laagi Tujhse Laganand Vinod in Shubh Vivah. He also played an episodic role of Neel in anthology series Teri Meri Love Stories on Star Plus. He was last seen in Life OK's show Dil Se Di Dua... Saubhagyavati Bhava? as Raj. He later played the lead role of Sharad Ghotala in Badi Door Se Aaye Hai on SAB TV. Recently, he played the role of Madhav Solanki in the show Kaatelal & Sons.

Personal life
Vinay married his longtime girlfriend Pooja Dhanwani in February 2012 in Mumbai. The couple became parents to a baby girl on 8 January 2021. He announced the arrival of his daughter on instagram.

Television

References

External links
 

1988 births
Living people
Indian male television actors
Indian male soap opera actors